Micromeria remota is a species of flowering plant in the family Lamiaceae.
It is found only in Yemen.
Its natural habitats are subtropical or tropical dry forests and rocky areas.

References

remota
Endemic flora of Socotra
Least concern plants
Taxonomy articles created by Polbot